Brigadier Gerard (5 March 1968 – 29 October 1989) was a British Thoroughbred racehorse and sire. In a racing career which lasted from June 1970 until October 1972, he won seventeen of his eighteen races. The colt is rated the best racehorse trained in Britain in the 20th century.

Brigadier Gerard was unbeaten as a two-year-old in 1970, when his most important win came in the Middle Park Stakes. At three he was again unbeaten, defeating Mill Reef in a famous race for the 2000 Guineas and going on to win the St. James's Palace Stakes, Sussex Stakes, Goodwood Mile and Queen Elizabeth II Stakes over a mile, before moving up in distance to win the Champion Stakes over ten furlongs. As a four-year-old he won the Lockinge Stakes, Prince of Wales's Stakes and Eclipse Stakes before moving up in distance to win the King George VI and Queen Elizabeth Stakes over one and a half miles. Brigadier Gerard sustained his only defeat when beaten by Roberto in the inaugural running of the Benson and Hedges Gold Cup.

Background
Bred by John Hislop in England and foaled on 5 March 1968, Brigadier Gerard was a son of the stallion Queen's Hussar, winner of the Sussex Stakes and the Lockinge Stakes, and the non-winning racemare, La Paiva, a daughter of Prince Chevalier. On his female side he traced back to the brilliant fillies' Triple Crown winner, Pretty Polly, who was his fifth dam. This beautifully balanced bay colt was named after Arthur Conan Doyle's swashbuckling hero. Brigadier Gerard had good conformation, an excellent temperament and stood 16 hands 2 inches high.

Brigadier Gerard was trained during his racing career by Major Dick Hern and ridden in all his races by Joe Mercer.

Racing career

1970: two-year-old season

Brigadier Gerard began his two-year-old career on 24 June 1970 in the Berkshire Stakes at Newbury. The Berkshire Stakes, run over five furlongs and worth £1201 to the winner, drew a field of five runners. The odds-on favourite Young and Foolish was the comfortable winner of a big field Newmarket maiden and was second on his only other start to the subsequent winner of the Windsor Castle Stakes at Royal Ascot. The only other fancied runner was Mais‘y Dotes winner of four from her six starts in modest company. Brigadier Gerard was ridden by Joe Mercer and was relatively unfancied at odds of 100/7.
In the race Joe sat behind the more experienced runners until approaching the two furlong marker where he gave the Brigadier the office and he strode eight to ten lengths clear before being allowed to ease down before the line for an easy five length success.

So easy was this first success the Brigadier's owners decided to run him eight days later on 2 July in the Champagne Stakes, value £598 2s to the winner, run over six furlongs at Salisbury. Carrying a penalty for his previous win Brigadier Gerard was favourite at 13 to 8 on and another easy success, by 4 lengths, ensued.

Having had two races in quick succession the Brigadier was given a six-week break before reappearing in the Washington Singer Stakes at Newbury on 15 August with a value £1,154 to the winner. Starting favourite and odds of 4 to 9 on Brigadier Gerard led comfortably at the furlong marker winning by two lengths from Comedy Star.

Following three easy successes the Brigadier was now ready for his biggest test, the Middle Park Stakes at Newmarket, run over six furlongs and for a value of £10,515 18s. The opposition included Mummy's Pet, unbeaten in his three starts including the Hyperion Stakes and Norfolk Stakes, and Swing Easy winner of three of his four starts, his only defeat being at the hands of My Swallow in the Prix de la Salamandre at Longchamp. Mummy's Pet started favourite at 6/5 on, Swing Easy was 9 to 4 with Brigadier Gerard at 11 to 2. 
After a slow early pace Joe Mercer allowed Brigadier Gerard to stride into the lead where he drew steadily clear winning easing down by three lengths from Mummy's Pet with Swing Easy a further half a length away in third place.

As three-year-olds Mummy's Pet and Swing Easy remained at sprinting. Among other successes they won between them the Sceptre Stakes, Temple Stakes, Daniel Prenn, King's Stand Stakes and the Nunthorpe Stakes.

1971: three-year-old season

2000 Guineas Stakes, Newmarket

The field of six runners for the season's first colts' classic, the 2000 Guineas at Newmarket, was one of the smallest in recent memory. However, the three colts that had headed the Free handicap, My Swallow, Mill Reef, and Brigadier Gerard, had between them won 18 of their 19 races, including every major two-year-old race in Europe. My Swallow and Mill Reef had won their prep races, the Usher Stakes and the Greenham Stakes, while Brigadier Gerard, as planned, arrived at the Rowley Mile without a preparatory race. The race was generally billed as a match between the 6/4 favourite Mill Reef and the 2/1 second favourite My Swallow. Brigadier Gerard was relatively overlooked at 11/2, Minsky, a full brother to Nijinsky (horse) and Irish champion 2-y-o in 1970 at 15/2, Good Bond at 16/1 and Indian Ruler the complete outsider at 100/1.

In the race, My Swallow made the early running from Mill Reef until they came together, three furlongs from home. At this time Joe Mercer, on Brigadier Gerard, picked up his stick to ask him to close the two-length gap, but neither Geoff Lewis, on Mill Reef, nor Frankie Durr, on My Swallow, had yet made any comparable move. Then, with under three furlongs left to run, Brigadier Gerard drew level with Mill Reef. Brigadier Gerard strode away to win by three lengths.

What they said afterwards:

Mill Reef's jockey Geoff Lewis:
‘The moment Joe appeared it was all over’.
‘Joe’s horse had too much speed - he was too good’.
‘The winner was always going too well for me. As soon as Joe produced Brigadier Gerard I knew we were beaten’.
 
My Swallow's jockey Frankie Durr:
‘We didn’t cut each others throats in front, the winner just beat us‘.

Minsky's jockey Lester Piggott:
‘He was going as well as the leaders for six furlongs then found nothing‘.

Good Bond's jockey Jimmy Lindley: 
‘My colt was nearly flat out the whole way. It must be the best Guineas for 50 years‘.

Brigadier Gerard's jockey Joe Mercer:
‘Not a moment’s trouble. I thought we were going to win as soon as we went under the five furlong gate‘.  
‘I had to waken him up because they suddenly went an extra length away. But there was never any doubt when he got going. His neck was in front a quarter of a mile out and that was that’.

John Lawrence (Lord Oaksey):
He took a moment to find his full stride and Mercer tapped him once. But the response was more than he or anyone can have expected. For in 100 yards racing down the hill into the dip, Brigadier Gerard brushed aside the two colts who last year dominated European two-year-old racing. 
They finished together far ahead of the others, but he was three lengths clear and going away, as decisive and brilliant a winner of the 2000 Guineas as has been since Tudor Minstrel.  Mill Reef who duly took his revenge on My Swallow ran, it must be presumed, right up to his best form.

Mill Reef was not beaten again winning The Derby, Eclipse Stakes, King George VI & Queen Elizabeth Stakes, Prix de l'Arc de Triomphe, Prix Ganay and Coronation Cup.

St James's Palace Stakes, Ascot

Brigadier Gerard started at odds of 4/11 to defeat his three opponents in the last race of the day. Sparkler had won the classic trial at Thirsk, was beaten narrowly in the Irish 2000 Guineas, and more recently had won the Diomed Stakes at Epsom. Good Bond, last in the English 2000 Guineas and third to Sparkler in the Diomed, and Ballyhot, a recent maiden winner, made up the rest of the field of four runners.

Brigadier Gerard only led in the very last stride to defeat front-running Sparkler. After the race, John Hislop confirmed that his plans for Brigadier Gerard depended, in part at least, on Mr David Robinson, because Hislop was offering My Swallow one more chance of revenge. If Robinson would run his colt in the six-furlong July Cup, then Brigadier Gerard would meet him. If not, he would go next in the Sussex Stakes at Goodwood (John Lawrence).

Sussex Stakes, Goodwood

Heavy rain on the Tuesday and plenty more in the hour before racing had made the going not as deep as Ascot, but still considered to be much to the disadvantage of Brigadier Gerard. The four-year-olds, conceding 11 lbs to their younger rivals, were well represented. Leading the opposition was French challenger and soft-ground specialist Faraway Son, who had finished first but was subsequently disqualified in the French 2000 Guineas in favour of  French horse Caro, whose only defeat this season had been at the hand of Mill Reef in the Eclipse Stakes. Faraway Son had just beaten My Swallow by lengths at Longchamp. Joshua had won three of his four starts, with a narrow defeat by miler Welsh Pageant in the Lockinge Stakes being the only blot on his season.

The three-year-old division was also represented by Kings Company and Ashleigh. Kings Company, the second highest-rated two-year-old in Ireland, had won the Irish 2000 Guineas in somewhat controversial circumstances, in course record time and by the narrowest margin, from Sparkler and, more recently, had won the Cork and Orrery Stakes at Royal Ascot on soft ground. Ashleigh, highly regarded by his trainer, had also been a Royal Ascot winner winning the Jersey Stakes.

Joe Mercer allowed Brigadier Gerard to stroll along at the head of affairs until approaching the furlong maker, where Faraway Son and Joshua threw down their challenges. Brigadier Gerard pulled away to win by 5 lengths from Faraway Son, with the finishing time two seconds outside the record.

Faraway Son was not beaten again. He next won the Prix du Rond Point (over French 1000 Guineas winner Bold Fascinator), the Prix Moulin de Longchamp, and the Prix de la Foret.

Goodwood Mile, Goodwood

A small field contested this race run in damp, wintry conditions. Only two horses opposed Brigadier Gerard: Gold Rod and Ashleigh. Gold Rod had won the Prix Moulin the year before and had placed in nearly all of the top mile races while Ashleigh, having only his third run this season, had won the Jersey Stakes at Royal Ascot before losing to Brigadier Gerard in the Sussex Stakes. In the race Brigadier Gerard quickened at the two-furlong mark to win by 10 lengths. Gold Rod beat Ashleigh for the runner-up spot by four lengths.

Queen Elizabeth II Stakes, Ascot

Another small field contested this race run before a bumper crown at Ascot. Leading French challenger Dictus, fourth in last season's Champion Stakes just behind Nijinsky, and now fresh from victory in the Prix Jacques le Marois, where he defeated Sparkler by half a length, lined up alongside Ashleigh. Brigadier Gerard won by 8 lengths over Dictus in near course record time.

This was Brigadier Gerard's ninth consecutive success with a step up to a mile and a quarter in the Champion Stakes at Newmarket the next race on his agenda.

Champion Stakes, Newmarket

When Brigadier Gerard lined up for his first attempt at ten furlongs, a field of ten turned up to contest the £35,000 prize. From Great Britain, the leading older horses included Welsh Pageant, who was having his fourth run of the season, winning the Lockinge and Hungerford Stakes and finishing third in the Eclipse Stakes behind Mill Reef and Caro. Gold Rod was fresh from his win in the Prix La Coupe, where he exacted his revenge on Amadou, who had finished 5 lengths in front of him in the Prix Ganay. Great Wall (fourth to Nijinsky in the Derby), Leander (winner of the Prix Jean Prat at Chantilly as a three-year-old), and Tamil (winner of a minor event in Deauville) were also entered.  From France came Tratteggio, trained by Alec Head, having just won the Prix Henri Delamere by 6 lengths. Amadou had run Caro, the best older horse in France, very close before being beaten narrowly by Gold Rod. Roi Soliel was a mud lover, having won the Prix Djebel and Queen Anne Stakes. From Ireland came Rarity, a lightly raced 4-year-old with a distinct preference for soft ground. In his last start, Rarity had given a 4 lengths beating to Lombardo, whose form boasted an Epsom Derby 4th, beaten 6 lengths by Mill Reef, and an Irish Derby 2nd, beaten 3 lengths by Irish Ball.

The race itself was run in poor visibility with Welsh Pageant, Leander, Gold Rod, and Roi Soleil in the leading group and Brigadier Gerard in close behind them.  As they entered the Dip, Brigadier Gerard moved into the lead and pulled three lengths clear while Rarity made progress throughout the final furlong. Brigadier Gerard held on to win by a short head.

The 1971 season ended with Brigadier Gerard maintaining his unbeaten record with 10 wins and Mill Reef remaining unbeaten since their meeting in the 2000 Guineas at Newmarket Racecourse. The scene was now set for a showdown between the champions expected in the 1972 Eclipse Stakes at Sandown Park Racecourse.

1972: four-year-old season

The following year, Brigadier Gerard extended his unbeaten run to fifteen. In spring, he won the one-mile Lockinge Stakes and the ten-furlong Westbury Stakes, in which he conceded fourteen pounds to the runner-up Ballyhot.
At Royal Ascot, he won the Prince of Wales's Stakes by five lengths from Steel Pulse, setting a new course record.
In the Eclipse Stakes at Sandown Park, on unfavourably soft ground, he won by a length from Gold Rod to take his unbeaten sequence to fourteen.
In July, he moved up to one and half miles for the first time in Britain's most valuable race, the King George VI and Queen Elizabeth Stakes at Ascot. He won by one and a half lengths from Parnell, with Riverman five lengths back in third, but he hung to the right in the closing stages and his win was only confirmed after a stewards' enquiry.

Then came his loss in the Benson & Hedges Gold Cup run over an extended mile and a quarter at York. Brigadier Gerard (starting at 1/3) raced against the 1972 Epsom Derby winner Roberto and the runner-up, Rheingold, who started second favourite. Roberto had run poorly in his previous race, the Irish Derby, but, ridden by the Panamanian jockey Braulio Baeza, ran the race of his life with a front-running display, which shattered the course record, to defeat Brigadier Gerard by three lengths. There was a gap of ten lengths back to Gold Rod, who beat Rheingold for third. According to Joe Mercer, his horse was sick: "... when they got back to the stables and the horse put his head down, the mucus poured out of him. He was sick, yet he was still able to run second to the Derby winner, giving him 12 pounds." As his owner, John Hislop, acknowledged, re-examination of the race film showed that he actually beat Gold Rod by 17 lengths and also broke the course record. 

Brigadier Gerard returned in the Queen Elizabeth II Stakes and set a new course record by over a second as he won by 6 lengths from Sparkler (giving him 7 pounds).

On his final appearance, he defeated Riverman by one and a half lengths to win his second Champion Stakes. He retired at the end of his four-year-old season, a winner of 17 races from 18 starts, with total earnings of £253,024.70. On retirement, he had won more races than any other English classic winner of the twentieth century apart from Bayardo (winner of 22 from 25 starts) and his ancestress Pretty Polly (winner of 22 from 24 starts).

Stud record
He stood at stud first at the Egerton Stud, Newmarket and later at his owner's East Woodhay Stud. Brigadier Gerard was not a success as a sire, and much less successful than his contemporary and rival Mill Reef, but he did get a classic winner in Light Cavalry who won the St. Leger Stakes in 1980 as well as Vayrann the controversial winner of the 1981 Champion Stakes. Brigadier Gerard died in 1989 and his remains are interred in the gardens of the Swynford Hotel (formerly Swynford Paddocks), Six Mile Bottom, Newmarket. He appears in the fifth generation of 2015 US Triple Crown winner American Pharoah's pedigree, via his son, General.

Assessment and Honours
Brigadier Gerard was given an end-of-year Timeform rating of 141 in 1971, making him the equal highest rated horse of the year, alongside Mill Reef. He topped the Timeform ratings in 1972 with 144, the joint second highest figure at that time given for a flat racehorse, equal with Tudor Minstrel and one pound behind Sea Bird. The Brigadier Gerard Stakes at Sandown is named in his honour. In the 1972 British Horse of the Year poll conducted by the Racegoers' Club, Brigadier Gerard polled all forty of the available votes, making him the first horse to be unanimously elected to the honour.

Pedigree

See also
List of leading Thoroughbred racehorses
List of historical horses

References

1968 racehorse births
1989 racehorse deaths
Racehorses bred in the United Kingdom
Racehorses trained in the United Kingdom
Thoroughbred family 14-c
2000 Guineas winners
King George VI and Queen Elizabeth Stakes winners